In mathematics, a parallelization of a manifold  of dimension n is a set of n global smooth linearly independent vector fields.

Formal definition

A manifold is called parallelizable whenever it admits a parallelization.

Examples
Every Lie group is a parallelizable manifold.
The product of parallelizable manifolds is parallelizable.
Every affine space, considered as manifold, is parallelizable.

Properties
Proposition.

In other words,  is parallelizable if and only if  is a trivial bundle.

See also
Chart (topology)
Differentiable manifold
 Frame bundle
 Orthonormal frame bundle
 Principal bundle
 Connection (mathematics)
 G-structure
 Web (differential geometry)

Notes

References 
 
 

Differential geometry
Fiber bundles
Vector bundles